The Liguilla of the 2013 Liga MX Clausura is the final knockout tournament involving eight teams of Liga MX. The tournament began on 8 May 2013 and will end on 26 May 2013. The winners and runners-up of the competition will qualify for the 2013–14 CONCACAF Champions League.

Teams
The eight best teams in the general table qualified for the competition.

Source: www.ligamx.net

1. Querétaro may remain in the top 8, but they can no longer qualify to the liguilla as they have been relegated to Ascenso MX next season. If they at least place 8th, then the team placing 9th will qualify to the liguilla

Bracket
The eight qualified teams play two games against each other on a home-and-away basis. The winner of each match up is determined by aggregate score.

The teams were seeded one to eight in quarterfinals, and will be re-seeded one to four in semifinals, depending on their position in the general table. The higher seeded teams play on their home field during the second leg.

 Away goals rule is applied in the play-off round.
 If the two teams are tied after both legs and away goal rule applied, the higher seeded team advances.
 Both finalist qualify to the 2013–14 CONCACAF Champions League Group Stage.

Quarter-finals
The first legs of the quarterfinals were played on May 8 and 9. The second legs were played on May 11 and 12.

Kickoffs are given in local time (UTC-5 unless stated otherwise).

First leg

Second leg

Semi-finals
The first legs of the semifinals will be played on May 15 and May 16. The second legs will be played on May 18 and 19.

Kickoffs are given in local time (UTC-5 unless stated otherwise).

First leg

Second leg

Final

The first leg of the final will be played on May 23, the second leg on May 26.

Kickoffs are given in local time (UTC-5 unless stated otherwise).

First leg

Second leg

References

Clau